Roueché is a surname. Notable people with the surname include:

Berton Roueché (1910–1994), American writer
Charlotte Roueché (born 1946), British academic
Clayton Roueche (born 1975), Canadian gangster.

See also 
Roueche House, historic home in Pennsylvania

French-language surnames